Engelver Leonel Herrera Revolorio (born 11 May 1973) is a Guatemalan former football defender who last played for Antigua GFC of the Guatemalan second division.

Club career
Herrera, born in the country capital, played for Guatemalan giants CSD Comunicaciones in the second part of the 1990s. He has also played for USAC, Zacapa and Petapa before joining Antigua in summer 2009.

International career
He made his debut for Guatemala in a December 1995 UNCAF Nations Cup match against Panama and has earned a total of 18 caps, scoring 1 goal. He has represented his country in 1 FIFA World Cup qualification match, which turned out to be his final international. He also played at the 1995 and 1999 UNCAF Nations Cups as well as at the 1998 and 2000 CONCACAF Gold Cups.

References

External links

1973 births
Living people
Sportspeople from Guatemala City
Guatemalan footballers
Guatemala international footballers
1998 CONCACAF Gold Cup players
2000 CONCACAF Gold Cup players
Comunicaciones F.C. players
Antigua GFC players

Association football defenders
Deportivo Petapa players